Shahrak-e Shahid Montazeri (also Romanized as Shahrak-e Shahīd Montaz̧erī; also known as Shahrak-e Shahīd Moḩammad Montaz̧erī) is a village in Mahmudabad Rural District, in the Central District of Isfahan County, Isfahan Province, Iran. At the 2006 census, its population was 2,993, in 741 families.

References 

Populated places in Isfahan County